The light-second is a unit of length useful in astronomy, telecommunications and relativistic physics. It is defined as the distance that light travels in free space in one second, and is equal to exactly 299 792 458 metres (approximately 983 571 055 ft).

Just as the second forms the basis for other units of time, the light-second can form the basis for other units of length, ranging from the light-nanosecond ( or just under one international foot) to the light-minute, light-hour and light-day, which are sometimes used in popular science publications. The more commonly used light-year is also currently defined to be equal to precisely , since the definition of a year is based on a Julian year (not the Gregorian year) of exactly 365.25 days, each of exactly  SI seconds.

Use in telecommunications 
Communications signals on Earth rarely travel at precisely the speed of light in free space. Distances in fractions of a light-second are useful for planning telecommunications networks.

 One light-nanosecond is almost 300 millimetres (299.8 mm, 5 mm less than one foot), which limits the speed of data transfer between different parts of a large computer.
 One light-microsecond is about 300 metres.
 The mean distance, over land, between opposite sides of the Earth is 66.8 light-milliseconds.
 Communications satellites are typically 1.337 light-milliseconds (low Earth orbit) to 119.4 light-milliseconds (geostationary orbit) from the surface of the Earth. Hence there will always be a delay of at least a quarter of a second in a communication via geostationary satellite (119.4 ms times 2); this delay is just perceptible in a transoceanic telephone conversation routed by satellite. The answer will also be delayed with a quarter of a second and this is clearly noticeable during interviews or discussions on TV when sent over satellite.

Use in astronomy

The light-second is a convenient unit for measuring distances in the inner Solar System, since it corresponds very closely to the radiometric data used to determine them. (The match is not exact for an Earth-based observer because of a very small correction for the effects of relativity.) The value of the astronomical unit (roughly the distance between Earth and the Sun) in light-seconds is a fundamental measurement for the calculation of modern ephemerides (tables of planetary positions). It is usually quoted as "light-time for unit distance" in tables of astronomical constants, and its currently accepted value is  s.

 The mean diameter of Earth is about 0.0425 light-seconds.
 The average distance between Earth and the Moon (the lunar distance) is about 1.282 light-seconds.
 The diameter of the Sun is about 4.643 light-seconds.
 The average distance between Earth and the Sun (the astronomical unit) is 499.0 light-seconds.

Multiples of the light-second can be defined, although apart from the light-year, they are more used in popular science publications than in research works. For example:

 A light-minute is 60 light-seconds, and so the average distance between Earth and the Sun is 8.317 light-minutes.
 The average distance between Pluto and the Sun (34.72 AU) is 4.81 light-hours.
 Humanity's most distant artificial object, Voyager 1, has an interstellar velocity of 3.57 AU/year, or 29.7 light-minutes/year. As of 2023 the probe, launched in 1977, is over 22 light-hours from Earth and the Sun, and is expected to reach a distance of one light-day around November 2026 - February 2027.

See also
 100 megametres
 Geometrized unit system
 Light-year

References 

Units of length
Units of measurement in astronomy